Mellerup is a small town in the Danish municipality of Randers with a population of 525 in January 2022.

References

Cities and towns in the Central Denmark Region
Randers Municipality